William Leslie was a Scottish footballer who played as Defender for Lomas Athletic Club and the Argentina national team.

Career 
Leslie began his career in Lomas Athletic Club, team where he had won the first division championship 1893, and it had been the top scorer with 7 goals. Between 1900 and 1904 Leslie played in Quilmes Atlético Club.
  
In 1902 Leslie played in the Argentine team, who had played his first match against the Uruguay team. The match was played on 20 July 1902 in Montevideo, with a score 6–0 in favor of Argentina. Some of the Argentine goals were scored by Charles Dickinson and Juan Brown.

Titles 
Lomas Athletic
 Primera División: 1893, 1894, 1895, 1897, 1898
Lomas Academy
 Primera División: 1896

References 

Argentine footballers
l
Footballers from Buenos Aires
Scottish expatriate footballers
Scottish footballers
Expatriate footballers in Argentina
Year of birth missing
Year of death missing
Association football forwards